Llanwrtyd Wells ( "church of St Gwrtud") is a market town and community in Powys, Wales, in the historic county of Brecknockshire (Breconshire) on the Afon Irfon. The town is on the A483 between Llandovery and Builth Wells and is located near the pass between the Tywi and Irfon valleys.

The community also includes the smaller settlements of Llanwrtyd and Abergwesyn, the valley of the Afon Irfon, and a large part of the "Desert of Wales".

With a population of 850 (United Kingdom Census 2011), it claims to be the smallest town in Britain, although Fordwich in Kent has a smaller population.

History 
Llanwrtyd Wells grew in the 19th century as a spa town around the Ffynnon Ddrewllyd ("stinking well"), 1.5 miles from the much older settlement of Llanwrtyd. The town was also known as an eisteddfod site, and is the site of both the World Bog Snorkelling Championships and the annual Man versus Horse Marathon, as well as other annual events.

The Abernant Lake Hotel was built on the site of an old farm, to cater for the many visitors, keen to take the spa waters. The hotel grounds include a  lake created in 1903 by damming an oxbow of the Irfon. During World War II, the hotel was home to Bromsgrove School, evacuated from Worcestershire, and from 1943–45 to the Czechoslovak State School for Refugee Children. It remained as a hotel until 2007 when it became home to a multi-activity centre for school groups and families.

Llanwrtyd Wells had two golf clubs and courses during the 20th century, both now defunct. The early course was at the Dol-y-coed Hotel and the later one at Abernant Lake Hotel.

Cambrian Mill

Built in 1852, the Cambrian Woollen Mill was the largest woolen mill in the Llanidloes area, employing over 250 workers at its peak. It was reduced to an empty shell by a fire in November 1889, but rebuilt in 1902 and has been in continuous operation since then. It is one of very few woolen mills still operating in Wales. According to the mill's website, visitors can experience "700 years of weaving history".

Spa
Following the discovery in 1732 by the Rev. Theophilus Evans of waters claimed to have healing properties, Llanwrtyd Wells became a spa town. (In 1740 Wales' most famous hymn-writer, William Williams Pantycelyn was appointed curate to Evans.) 
The spa was referred to as Ffynnon Ddrewllyd "Stinking Well" because of the strong smell of hydrogen sulfide. The spa is located at the site of the Dol-y-Coed Hotel, now the home of Charcroft Electronics.

The fashion for spas reached its peak in the Victorian era and many of the hotels in the town date back to that time. The Belle Vue Hotel, the only purpose-built hotel in Llanwrtyd, was built in 1843.

Modern times
In contrast to its history as a spa town, when hundreds flocked to take the waters for their claimed medicinal effects, the area is now better known for recreations such as pony trekking, mountain biking, walking and birdwatching, and for its annual Man versus Horse Marathon, Beer Festival, World Bog Snorkeling Championship and Welsh Open stone skimming championship. The World Record for the longest distance a stone has been skimmed was set on Abernant Lake by Dougie Isaacs, a Scotsman . The town's largest employer Charcroft Electronics is located in buildings which were previously the Dol-y-Coed Hotel. The hotel, on the banks of the Irfon, dates from about 1535.

In 1984 the town was the location for the filming of the BBC sitcom The Magnificent Evans, written by Roy Clarke and starring Ronnie Barker, Sharon Morgan and Myfanwy Talog.

Governance
A Llanwrtyd Wells electoral ward exists, which also includes the neighbouring communities of Llangamarch and Treflys. This ward had a population of 1,875 at the 2011 Census.

Unlike many small towns in rural Wales, Llanwrtyd station still has a passenger train service. Heart of Wales line trains between Swansea and Shrewsbury call four times a day each way Monday to Saturday and twice each way on Sunday (2019 timetable)

Famous residents
The town is the home of Robin Kevan, also known as "Rob the Rubbish", who has become famous for his efforts to clean up Britain's countryside.

Town twinning
Llanwrtyd Wells is twinned with:
  Mériel, France
  Český Krumlov, Czech Republic

References

External links 
 Photos of Llanwrtyd Wells and surrounding area on geograph.org.uk

 
Towns in Powys
Communities in Powys